Hierapolis in Isauria was a city and diocese in ancient Isauria, which remains a Latin Catholic titular see. Its modern site seems unclear.

History 
The city was important enough in the Roman province of Isauria (in Asia Minor, now Asian Turkey) to become a suffragan of it capital Seleucia in Isauria's Metropolitan Archbishopric, but it was to fade.

Titular see 
The diocese was nominally restored in 1933.

It is vacant since decades, having had only the following incumbents, both of the lowest (episcopal) rank:
 Dominic Ignatius Ekandem (1953.08.07 – 1963.03.01) as Auxiliary Bishop of Calabar (Nigeria) (1953.08.07 – 1963.03.01), later Bishop of Ikot Ekpene (Nigeria) (1963.03.01 – 1989.06.19), Apostolic Administrator of Port Harcourt (Nigeria) (1970 – 1973), President of Catholic Bishops’ Conference of Nigeria (1973 – 1979), created Cardinal-Priest of S. Marcello (1976.05.24 – death 1995.11.24), President of Association of the Episcopal Conferences of Anglophone West Africa (1978 – 1983), Ecclesiastical Superior of Abuja (Nigeria) (1981.11.06 – 1989.06.19), Archbishop-Bishop of Abuja (Nigeria) (1989.06.19 – retired 1992.09.28) 
 José Alberto Lopes de Castro Pinto (1964.02.25 – 1976.01.16) as Auxiliary Bishop of São Sebastião do Rio de Janeiro (Brazil) (1964.02.25 – 1976.01.16), later Bishop of Guaxupé (Brazil) (1976.01.16 – 1989.09.14)

References

Source and external links 
 GCatholic with titular incumbent biography links

Catholic titular sees in Asia
Populated places in ancient Isauria
Former populated places in Turkey
Lost ancient cities and towns